Cuéllar is a town in Spain.

Cuellar or Cuéllar may also refer to:

 Cuellar (surname)

Places
Buenavista de Cuéllar, a Mexican city
Buenavista de Cuéllar (municipality), a Mexican municipality
Fresneda de Cuéllar, a Spanish municipality
Lastras de Cuéllar, a Spanish municipality
Mata de Cuéllar, a Spanish municipality
San Cristóbal de Cuéllar, a Spanish municipality
Cuéllar Castle, a Spanish castle